Bovey Tracey is a small town and civil parish in Devon, England, on the edge of Dartmoor, its proximity to which gives rise to the "slogan" used on the town's boundary signs, "The Gateway to the Moor". It is often known locally as "Bovey". It is about 10 miles south-west of Exeter and lies on the A382 road, about halfway between Newton Abbot and Moretonhampstead. The village is at the centre of the electoral ward of Bovey. At the 2011 census the population of this ward was 7,721.

History
Bovey Tracey was an established Saxon community and takes its name from the River Bovey. The name first appears in Domesday Book as Bovi and possibly earlier as Buui. The town gained its second name from the de Tracey family who were lords of the manor after the Norman Conquest, and was first documented as Bovitracy in 1309.

One member of the family, William de Tracy, was implicated in the murder of Archbishop Thomas Becket in Canterbury Cathedral in 1170. It is thought that he rebuilt the parish church of St Peter, St Paul and St Thomas of Canterbury as penance for the murder. In the early 13th century Henry de Tracey created a borough here and in 1259 was granted the right to hold a weekly market and an annual three-day fair.

During the English Civil War on 9 January 1646, Oliver Cromwell and a contingent of his Roundhead army entered Bovey Tracey after dark and caught part of Lord Wentworth's Regiment by surprise, catching a number of officers playing cards in an inn. Many of Wentworth's Royalist troops escaped, but Cromwell did capture about 400 horses. If local legend is to be believed, the Royalists escaped by throwing coins from the windows in order to distract the poorly paid Roundhead troops. The next day a battle was fought on nearby Bovey Heath ending in victory for Cromwell's army.

The name of Cromwell lives on in the town today in both the public house "The Cromwell Arms" and the remains of a nearby stone arch, known locally (and incorrectly) as "Cromwell's Arch". The arch is actually what is left of a priory that stood previously on the site of the nearby Baptist Church.

The Bovey Tracey Potteries operated from the 1750s for about 200 years.

Bovey railway station was opened on 26 June 1866 with the new Moretonhampstead and South Devon Railway on a site to the west of the town. It closed to passengers on 28 February 1959, but goods trains continued to operate until 6 July 1970.

Bovey Tracey was twinned with Le Molay-Littry in Normandy, however in February 2018 local Councillors surprisingly discovered that the French town had unexpectedly twinned with another location, Theydon Bois in Essex.

Geography
Bovey Tracey lies in the valley of the River Bovey at the junction of the A382 road (between Newton Abbot and Moretonhampstead) and the B3387 road (Chudleigh Knighton to Haytor Vale).

Climate
Since 1990, the highest recorded temperature was 27 °C (81 °F) in July 2018 and the lowest was -5 °C (23 °F) in February 1991 and March 2018.

Notable features

The town has over a hundred listed buildings. The parish church, at the top of the town, is grade I listed. It has a tower dating from the 14th century, many 15th-century carvings including three misericords, and a screen described by Arthur Mee as "one of the finest in this county of fine screens". The screen was restored in 1887 with the central panels the work of Charles Edgar Buckeridge. The church has an unbroken list of vicars from 1258. On Hind Street, the East Dartmoor Baptist Church was built in 1824 and is now grade II listed. Original support for the church came mainly from workers in the Bovey Potteries. Bovey Tracey Town Hall was completed in 1866.

Since 1986, the Devon Guild of Craftsmen contemporary crafts gallery has occupied a building known as Riverside Mill, on the bank of the River Bovey. The building, dating from 1854, has an undershot waterwheel that was used to pump water up to a tank in its tower. The stored water was used as the supply for a nearby house owned by John Divett and to water its stable yard and gardens. Nearby, the Bovey Tracey Heritage Centre in the old Bovey railway station is run by volunteers and is open in the summer months.

On the outskirts of the town are the House of Marbles, a visitor attraction on the site of the historic pottery; and the headquarters of the Dartmoor National Park Authority at Parke, a large house which is leased to the authority by the National Trust. Also nearby are a Devon Wildlife Trust nature reserve at Bovey Heath and the Haytor Granite Tramway, the route of which runs through the parish, west of the town.

According to the town council the town has a "good mixture of shops" and there is a farmers' market on alternate Saturday mornings.

The town also hosts multiple events throughout the year for both tourists and the local community, including: 'Nourish', a food and gin festival held in September; and the 'Contemporary Craft Festival', held in June.

Historic estates
Within the parish of Bovey Tracey are various historic estates, including:
Indio, long a seat of the Southcott family, later of Bentinck. The Indeo Pottery was established here between about 1766 and 1785.
Parke, seat of Nicholas Eveleigh (d.1620) whose monument with effigy survives in Bovey Tracey Church. His widow married Elize Hele, whose monument and effigy faces that of Eveleigh. There are several inscribed tablets to later owners in Bovey Tracey Church. Now the headquarters of the Dartmoor National Park Authority.

Sport
Bovey Tracey is the start point of the Dartmoor Devil bicycle ride, an annual Audax UK Brevet Populaire event held in late October that takes in over 2,000 m of climbing and over 100 km around and across Dartmoor, the ride ends in nearby Manaton.

The town has a Non-League football club Bovey Tracey A.F.C. who play at The Western Counties Roofing Ground in the South West Peninsula League.

References

External links

 Bovey Tracey Town Council

 
Towns in Devon
Dartmoor
Civil parishes in Devon
Teignbridge